Tachyporus dispar is a species of rove beetle from Tachyporinae subfamily that can be found in  Czech Republic, Slovakia, and throughout Western Europe (except Andorra, Luxembourg, Malta, and Portugal, where its existence is unknown).

References

Beetles described in 1789
Beetles of Europe
Tachyporinae